g 1988 1. deild was the 46th season of Faroese Premier League Football, and when it was referred to as 1. deild (First Division).

Overview
It was contested by 10 teams, and Havnar Bóltfelag won the championship.

League standings

Results

Top goalscorers

References

1. deild seasons
Faroe
Faroe
Football